Polenske is a surname. Notable people with the surname include:

Karen R. Polenske (born 1937), American economist
Michael Polenske, American entrepreneur, gallery owner, and vintner

See also
Polenske value, in food chemistry, a value determined when examining fat